The Z18 class  (formerly 285 class and R.285 class) was a class consisting of six 0-6-0T steam tank locomotives built by Vulcan Foundry for the New South Wales Government Railways of Australia.

Order
An order was placed in February 1882, with the Vulcan Foundry for six 2-4-0T locomotives to the specification of the then Acting Locomotive Engineer, Mr Scott. During Mr Scott’s subsequent absence in England on official business, Thomas Middleton, Locomotive Engineer, had the specifications altered to 0-6-0T wheel arrangement, together with other variations to the original order. Commissioner Goodchap approved the changes and despite the protests on Scott’s return, the variations were made.

The six locomotives were delivered in 1884 and designated the 285 class. They became the (R) 285 class in 1889 and the Z18 class in 1924.

Operation
Their  driving wheels proved too small for the speed required and they were reduced to shunting duties in Sydney Yard, with just the occasional venture into the suburbs.

In 1907, the locomotives were fitted with new domed boilers, replacing the domeless versions originally fitted. This increased their weight by 3 tons which improved their adhesion factor. Power reversing gear was fitted in 1922, making them the first class in New South Wales to be so fitted. It was a hydraulic type and was excellent when shunting at Sydney station, however this was only short lived and Johnson bar lever reversing gear was fitted shortly after.

In 1927, following the release of other locomotives with the electrification of the Sydney suburban network, the class was transferred to locomotive depot work, some being fitted with cranes and renumbered into the (X)10 series. Later, with the cranes removed, they were restored to their Z18 numbers and worked at Port Kembla shunting. 1076 was an exception which continued to be known by that number. No. 1802 (originally R286) was sold to the Public Works Department in 1927 and became their No. 75. It continued in service until it was cut up for scrap metal in 1964. 1801 and 1806 were sold to the Wallarah Coal Company in 1957 and worked on the isolated Catherine Hill Bay Coal Railway until the line ceased operation in December 1963.

Preservation

See also
 NSWGR steam locomotive classification

References

Extra reading

0-6-0T locomotives
Railway locomotives introduced in 1884
18
Vulcan Foundry locomotives
Standard gauge locomotives of Australia